Cæsar Clement (died 28 August 1626) was an English Catholic recusant.

Life
The great-nephew of Sir Thomas More's friend, Dr. John Clement, he was a student at the English College, Douai when in 1578 the college moved to Reims; but was shortly sent to the English College, Rome, where he was admitted 5 September 1579. He was ordained priest in 1585, but remained in Rome till October 1587. He took the degree of Doctor of Theology in Italy, probably in Rome itself.

Though originally destined for the English mission, Clement never went to England, but held the major positions of Dean of St. Gudule's, Brussels, and Vicar general of the King of Spain's army in Flanders. He was a generous benefactor to English Catholic exiles, especially the Augustinian Canonesses of Louvain. In 1612 he, with the Rev. Robert Chambers was commissioned from Rome to make a visit to Douai College so as to put an end to the dissatisfaction with the administration there.

Clement died in Brussels, on 28 August 1626.

References

Attribution
 Cites:
Charles Dodd, Church History of England (London, 1737), II, 388; 
John Morris, Troubles of our Catholic Forefathers (London, 1872), I, 40, 41, 47, 57; 
Douay Diaries (London. 1877); 
Henry Foley, Records Eng. Prov. S. J. (London. 1880), VI, 138; 
Joseph Gillow, Bibl. Dict. Eng. Cath. (London, 1885), I, 497-8; 
Thompson Cooper in Dictionary of National Biography (London, 1887). XI, 32; 
Adam Hamilton, Chronicles of the English Augustinian Canonesses of Louvain (London, 1904-6).

English College, Rome alumni
16th-century English Roman Catholic priests
17th-century English Roman Catholic priests
1626 deaths
Year of birth unknown
17th-century English clergy